The Brampton Excelsiors are a Junior "B" box lacrosse team from Brampton, Ontario, Canada.  The Excelsiors play in the OLA Junior B Lacrosse League and are eligible to compete for the Founders Cup National Championship.  The Excelsiors are members of the same system of teams as the Major Excelsiors and the Junior A Excelsiors.

History

Announced October 16, 2011, the Excelsiors were admitted as an expansion team into the OJBLL for the 2012 season.

On April 22, 2012, the Jr. B Excelsiors played their first game, at home, with an 11–6 win over the Hamilton Bengals.  The Excelsiors finished the season with a 4-16 record and did not make the playoffs.

In their second season, the Excelsiors finished 10–10 and received the final playoff spot in their conference. In the conference quarter-final, they drew the undefeated, two-time defending national champion Six Nations Rebels. The Rebels won 15–5 and 17–5 to finish the Excelsiors' season and first playoff berth.

The 2014 season was filled with a summer-long battle against the Welland Generals and Owen Sound North Stars for the final playoff spot in the West.  Even though the final rankings were not determined until the final weekend of the season, the Generals topped both Owen Sound and Brampton for the final spot.

In the 2015 season, the Brampton Excelsiors were moved from the West division to the East division because Mimico's Jr B  was folded and became a Jr A team after moving from Mississauga.

Season-by-season results
Note: GP = Games played, W = Wins, L = Losses, T = Ties, Pts = Points, GF = Goals for, GA = Goals against

Playoff results

References

External links
Official website
The Bible of Lacrosse
Unofficial OLA Page

Ontario Lacrosse Association teams